ARS Produktion is a German classical music record label founded in 1987 by flautist Annette Schumacher and based in Ratingen.

References

External links
ars-produktion.de

Classical music record labels